Robie may refer to:

People

Given name 
 Robie Harris, American children's author
 Robie Lester (1925–2005), American voice actress and singer
 Robie Macauley (1919–1995), American writer, editor and critic
 Robie Marcus Hooker Palmer (1941–2013), American diplomat
 Robie Lewis Reid (1866–1945), Canadian historian and jurist

Surname 
 Carl Robie (1945–2011), American swimmer
 David Robie (born 1945), New Zealand journalist
 Edward D. Robie (1831–1911), United States Navy officer
 Frederick Robie (1822–1912), American politician
 Jean-Baptiste Robie (1821–1910), Belgian painter
 John Robie, American musician and record producer
 Reuben Robie (1799–1872), American politician
 Simon Bradstreet Robie (1770–1858), Canadian politician
 Thomas Robie (1689–1729), American scientist and physician
 Virginia Huntington Robie (1868–1957), American writer 
 Wendy Robie (born 1953), American actress

Other uses 
 Robie (automobile), produced in 1914
 Robie House, a U.S. National Historic Landmark now on the campus of the University of Chicago
 Robie Street, a road in Halifax, Nova Scotia
 ROBIE Award, presented by the Jackie Robinson Foundation